Peter Jennings (1938–2005) was a Canadian-American television journalist.

Peter Jennings may also refer to:
 Peter Jennings (Australia), executive director of Australian Strategic Policy Institute
 Sir Peter Jennings (serjeant-at-arms) (born 1934), British public servant, Serjeant-at-Arms
 Peter R. Jennings (born 1950), Canadian scientist and entrepreneur